Katzhütte is a municipality in the district Saalfeld-Rudolstadt, in Thuringia, Germany.

Geography
The municipality Katzhütte is the centre of the upper Schwarza valley.

History
The borders of the present day town were formed in 1950 by the consolidation of Katzhütte and Oelze into a single large municipality. At its founding there were about 3800 inhabitants, but following consolidation the number of inhabitants has dramatically decreased. By 2020 there were only 1,291 citizens remaining.

The town is well known as the home of the porcelain manufacturer Porzellanfabrik Hertwig & Co., founded by Christoph Hertwig and Benjamin Beyermann in 1864.

References

Municipalities in Thuringia
Saalfeld-Rudolstadt
Schwarzburg-Rudolstadt